Lovely Little Lonely is the sixth studio album by American rock band The Maine and was released on April 7, 2017, through the band's label 8123. It debuted at number 32 on the Billboard 200, however, it reached as high as number 4 on the US Top Rock Albums chart and at number 3 on the US Independent Albums chart.

Recording 
Recording for their sixth album initially took place in New York in the fall of 2016. The band had wanted to record in the city for a while and Pat suggested taking a week to fly out and find a space to work in. They set out with producer Colby Wedgeworth and recorded at the Brooklyn Patch - a house with a built-in studio made specifically for bands to record/write in. Satisfied with their New York experience but searching for more inspiration, the guys ended up at an Airbnb in Gualala, California. The home was transformed into a recording space in the mountains, overlooking the ocean. The recording process was documented by the band and made into a mini YouTube series which they titled "Miserable Youth".

Release 
After a series of teasers on their social media accounts, The Maine announced their upcoming album on January 15, 2017. Four days later, "Bad Behavior" was made available for streaming. On January 20, the group headlined 8123 Fest. A music video was released for "Bad Behavior" on February 23. The song peaked at number 44 on Billboard's Spotify Viral 50 chart. On March 2, "Black Butterflies and Déjà Vu" was made available for streaming. On March 26, the group released a clip of "How Do You Feel?". On March 29, "Do You Remember? (The Other Half of 23)" was made available for streaming. Preceded by a one-off show in the UK, the group embarked on a North American tour in March and April. The band organized small pop-up shops throughout select cities of the tour to sell merchandise and give fans a chance to connect with them while on the road.

Lovely Little Lonely was released on April 7. "Just hearing the people sing songs off the record before this and our most recent record way louder than any of the older songs is kind of insane. It just feels good to go out there and have people respond this way, to what we’re doing" says the band about the release of new material and touring. On May 26, the group released an acoustic version of "Bad Behavior". Following two shows in Asia in June, the group went on a tour of Brazil in July. In July and August, the group supported Dashboard Confessional on their headlining US tour. On August 4, the group released an acoustic version of their third single from the album, "I Only Wanna Talk to You". Their fourth single "How Do You Feel?" was released on August 11, 2017. On August 17, a music video was released for "Taxi". In October and November, the group embarked on The Modern Nostalgia Tour where they performed Lovely Little Lonely and American Candy in their entirety. They were supported by Dreamers and Night Riots.

Reception 
The album was quickly met with overall praise from fans and music critics alike. Jesse Richman of Alternative Press writes "The result is an album that feels timeless, even on first impact. It’s the Maine’s best batch of songs since Pioneer, their catchiest material since Can’t Stop Won’t Stop and their most cohesive work to date". The Maine is constantly evolving and changing their sound ever so slightly and luckily fans continue to demand more music and tour dates. Amber Ainsworth of ClickonDetroit says "The guitars are more prominent and defining, while there’s a line between it being entirely a rock album and being something that doesn’t fit neatly into one genre".

Track listing  
 "Don't Come Down" –  3:13
 "Bad Behavior" –  3:10
 "Lovely" –  0:34 
 "Black Butterflies and Déjà Vu" –  3:23 
 "Taxi" –  3:07
 "Do You Remember? (The Other Half of 23)" –  3:02 
 "Little" –  1:13 
 "The Sound of Reverie" –  3:30 
 "Lost in Nostalgia" –  1:40 
 "I Only Wanna Talk to You" –  4:33 
 "Lonely" –  2:32
 "How Do You Feel?" –  4:22

Personnel 
 John O'Callaghan – vocals, guitar, piano
 Jared Monaco – lead guitar
 Kennedy Brock – rhythm guitar
 Garret Nickelsen – bass guitar
 Pat Kirch – drums

Charts

References 

2017 albums
The Maine (band) albums